Madonna and Child with St John the Baptist and St Catherine of Alexandria is a c.1495 oil on panel painting by Perugino of the Madonna and Child with John the Baptist and Catherine of Alexandria. It is now in the Louvre in Paris.

It was produced using the same cartoon as Madonna and Child with Two Saints (Kunsthistorisches Museum) and Madonna and Child with the Infant John the Baptist (Städel Museum), with very little variation between the three works. The face of the Madonna is based on Perugino's wife Chiara Fancelli

References

Bibliography
  Vittoria Garibaldi, Perugino, in Pittori del Rinascimento, Scala, Florence, 2004 
  Pierluigi De Vecchi, Elda Cerchiari, I tempi dell'arte, volume 2, Bompiani, Milan, 1999. 
  Stefano Zuffi, Il Quattrocento, Electa, Milan, 2004. 

Paintings of the Madonna and Child by Pietro Perugino
1490s paintings
Paintings depicting John the Baptist
Paintings of Catherine of Alexandria
Paintings in the Louvre by Italian artists